Saint-Jean-de-Boiseau is a commune in the Loire-Atlantique department in western France.

Population

Notable people 
 Barthélémy Baraille (1882-1970), a member of the criminal anarchist Bonnot gang, was a municipal councillor from Saint-Jean-de-Boiseau around 1945. 
 Edmond Bertreux (1911-1991), painter, is buried in the cemetery of Saint-Jean-de-Boiseau, which he often depicted in his art.
 Jean Brochard (1893-1972), actor, resident of Saint-Jean-de-Boiseau after having bought the house that his grandmother lived; he spent the rest of his life there.
 Émile-Joseph Legal (1849-1920), oblate missionnary, founder of the colony of Saint-Paul-des-Métis in the province of Alberta in Canada.
 Mose (1917-2003), designer, was born there.

See also
Communes of the Loire-Atlantique department

References

Saintjeandeboiseau